The Labyrinthulomycetes (ICBN) or Labyrinthulea (ICZN) are a class of protists that produce a network of filaments or tubes, which serve as tracks for the cells to glide along and absorb nutrients for them.  The two main groups are the labyrinthulids (or slime nets) and thraustochytrids.  They are mostly marine, commonly found as parasites on algae and seagrasses or as decomposers on dead plant material.  They also include some parasites of marine invertebrates.

Characteristics 
Although they are outside the cells, the filaments of Labyrinthulomycetes are surrounded by a membrane.  They are formed and connected with the cytoplasm by a unique organelle called a sagenogen or bothrosome. The cells are uninucleated and typically ovoid, and move back and forth along the amorphous network at speeds varying from 5-150 μm per minute. Among the labyrinthulids, the cells are enclosed within the tubes, and among the thraustochytrids, they are attached to their sides.

Classification 

Labyrinthulomycetes/Labyrinthulea used to belong to the defunct fungal phylum Labyrinthulomycota. They were originally considered unusual slime moulds, although they are not very similar to the other sorts.  The structure of their zoospores and genetic studies show them to be a primitive group of heterokonts, but their classification and treatment remains somewhat unsettled.

This class has usually two orders, Labyrinthulales and Thraustochytriales (ICBN), or Labyrinthulida and Thraustochytrida (ICZN), but a third has recently been proposed.

 Genus Stellarchytrium FioRito & Leander 2016
 Family Oblongichytriidae Cavalier-Smith 2012
 Genus Oblongichytrium Yokoyama & Honda 2007
 Order Labyrinthulida Doflein 1901
 Family Aplanochytriidae Leander ex Cavalier-Smith 2012
 Genus Aplanochytrium Bahnweg & Sparrow 1972 [Labyrinthuloides Perkins 1973] 
 Family Labyrinthulidae Cienkowski 1867
 Genus Labyrinthomyxa Duboscq 1921
 Genus Pseudoplasmodium Molisch 1925
 Genus Labyrinthula Cienkowski 1864 [Labyrinthodictyon Valkanov 1969; Labyrinthorhiza Chadefaud 1956]
 Order Amphitremida Gomaa et al. 2013
 Family Diplophryidae Cavalier-Smith 2012
 Genus Diplophrys Barker 1868
 Family Amphitrematidae Poche 1913
 Genus Paramphitrema Valkanov 1970
 Genus Archerella Loeblich & Tappan 1961
 Genus Amphitrema Archer 1867
 Order Thraustochytriida Alderman & 1974
 Genus Pyrrhosorus Juel 1901
 Genus Thanatostrea Franc & Arvy 1969
 Family Althorniidae Cavalier-Smith 2012
 Genus Althornia Jones & Alderman 1972
 Family Sorodiplophryidae Cavalier-Smith 2012
 Genus Sorodiplophrys Olive & Dykstra 1975
 Family Amphifilidae Cavalier-Smith 2012
 Genus Amphifila Cavalier-Smith 2012
 Genus Fibrophrys columna Takahashi et al. 2016
 Family Thraustochytriidae Sparrow ex Cejp 1959
 Genus Japonochytrium Kobayasi & Ôkubo 1953
 Genus Monorhizochytrium Doi & Honda 2017
 Genus Sicyoidochytrium Yokoy., Salleh & Honda 2007
 Genus Aurantiochytrium Yokoy. & Honda 2007
 Genus Ulkenia Gaertn. 1977
 Genus Parietichytrium Yokoy., Salleh & Honda 2007
 Genus Botryochytrium Yokoy., Salleh & Honda 2007
 Genus Schizochytrium Goldst. & Belsky emend. Booth & Mill.
 Genus Thraustochytrium Sparrow 1936
 Genus Hondaea Amato & Cagnac 2018
 Genus Labyrinthulochytrium Hassett & Gradinger 2018

Genetic code 
The labyrinthulomycete Thraustochytrium aureum is notable for the alternative genetic code of its mitochondria which use  as a stop codon instead of coding for Leucine. This code is represented by NCBI translation table 23, Thraustochytrium mitochondrial code.

Gallery

References

External links 

 Labyrinthulomycota

Heterokont classes
Bigyra